NGC 4308 is an elliptical galaxy in the constellation Coma Berenices. It is a member of the Coma I Group.

References

External links
 

Elliptical galaxies
Coma Berenices
4308
07426
40011
Coma I Group